Arabic verbs, like the verbs in other Semitic languages, and the entire vocabulary in those languages, are based on a set of two to five (but usually three) consonants called a root (triliteral or quadriliteral according to the number of consonants). The root communicates the basic meaning of the verb, e.g.   'write',   'read',   'eat'. Changes to the vowels in between the consonants, along with prefixes or suffixes, specify grammatical functions such as person, gender, number, tense, mood, and voice. 

Various categories are marked on verbs:
 Three tenses (present, past; future tense is indicated by the prefix  or the particle  and the present tense).
 Two voices (active, passive)
 Two genders (masculine, feminine)
 Three persons (first, second, third)
 Three numbers (singular, dual, plural)
 Six moods in the non-past only (indicative, subjunctive, jussive, imperative, and short and long energetics)
 Nineteen forms, the derivational systems indicating derivative concepts such as intensive, causative, reciprocal, reflexive, frequentative etc. For each form, there is also an active and a passive participle (both adjectives, declined through the full paradigm of gender, number, case and state) and a verbal noun (declined for case; also, when lexicalized, may be declined for number).

Weakness is an inherent property of a given verb determined by the particular consonants of the verb root (corresponding to a verb conjugation in Classical Latin and other European languages), with five main types of weakness and two or three subtypes of each type.

Arabic grammarians typically use the root   to indicate the particular shape of any given element of a verbal paradigm.

The maximum possible total number of verb forms derivable from a root — not counting participles and verbal nouns — is approximately 13 person/number/gender forms; times 9 tense/mood combinations, counting the س-  future (since the moods are active only in the present tense, and the imperative has only 5 of the 13 paradigmatic forms); times 17 form/voice combinations (since forms IX, XI–XV exist only for a small number of stative roots, and form VII cannot normally form a passive), for a total of 1,989. Each of these has its own stem form, and each of these stem forms itself comes in numerous varieties, according to the weakness (or lack thereof) of the underlying root.

Inflectional categories
Each particular lexical verb is specified by four stems, two each for the active and passive voices. In a particular voice, one stem (the past stem) is used for the past tense, and the other (the non-past stem) is used for the present and future tenses, along with non-indicative moods, e.g. subjunctive and imperative. The past and non-past stems are sometimes also called the perfective stem and imperfective stem, respectively, based on a traditional misinterpretation of Arabic stems as representing grammatical aspect rather than grammatical tense. (Although there is still some disagreement about the interpretation of the stems as tense or aspect, the dominant current view is that the stems simply represent tense, sometimes of a relative rather than absolute nature. There are some unusual usages of the stems in certain contexts that were once interpreted as indicating aspectual distinctions, but are now thought to simply be idiosyncratic constructions that do not neatly fit into any aspectual paradigm.)

To the past stem, suffixes are added to mark the verb for person, number and gender, while to the non-past stem, a combination of prefixes and suffixes are added. (Very approximately, the prefixes specify the person and the suffixes indicate number and gender.) A total of 13 forms exist for each of the two stems, specifying person (first, second or third); number (singular, dual or plural); and gender (masculine or feminine).

There are six separate moods in the non-past: indicative, imperative, subjunctive, jussive, short energetic and long energetic. The moods are generally marked by suffixes. When number suffixes are present, the moods are either distinguished by different forms of the suffixes (e.g.   for masculine plural indicative vs.   for masculine plural subjunctive/imperative/jussive), or not distinguished at all. The imperative exists only in the second person and is distinguished from the jussive by the lack of the normal second-person prefix  .

The third person masculine singular past tense form serves as the "dictionary form" used to identify a verb, similar to the infinitive in English. (Arabic has no infinitive.) Using the third person masculine singular as the dictionary citation form is more useful in that the vowels that appear in the remaining present tense forms are evident. Especially in form I verbs, without prior knowledge, these vowels are often not evident based purely on the past-tense forms.

Tense 

There are three tenses in Arabic: the past tense, the present tense and the future tense. The future tense in Classical Arabic is formed by adding either the prefix   or the separate word   onto the beginning of the present tense verb, e.g.   or   'he will write'.

In some contexts, the tenses represent aspectual distinctions rather than tense distinctions. The usage of Arabic tenses is as follows:
 The past tense often (but not always) specifically has the meaning of a past perfective, i.e. it expresses the concept of 'he did' as opposed to 'he was doing'. The latter can be expressed using the combination of the past tense of the verb   'to be' with the present tense or active participle, e.g.   or   'he was writing'. There are some special verbs known as "compound verbs" that can express many grammatical aspects such as Inchoative, Durative etc., for example   means "It started to attract attention" which badaʾa conveys the meaning of "to start doing something (in the past)"
 The two tenses can be used to express relative tense (or in an alternative view, grammatical aspect) when following other verbs in a serial verb construction. In such a construction, the present tense indicates time simultaneous with the main verb, while the past tense indicates time prior to the main verb. (Or alternatively, the present tense indicates the imperfective aspect while the past tense indicates the perfective aspect.)

In all but Form I, there is only one possible shape for each of the past and non-past stems for a given root. In Form I, however, different verbs have different shapes. Examples:
   'write'
   'earn'
   'read'
   'turn'
   'become big, grow up'
The vowel  occurs in most past stems, while  occurs in some (especially intransitive) and  occurs only in a few stative verbs (i.e. whose meaning is 'be X' or 'become X' where X is an adjective). The most common patterns are:
 past: ; non-past:  or 
 past: , non-past:  (when the second or third root consonant is a "guttural," i.e. one of )
 past: ; non-past: 
 past: ; non-past:

Mood 

In less formal Arabic and in spoken dialects, the subjunctive mood is used as the only imperfective tense (subjunctivism) and the final ḥarakah vowel is not pronounced.

The imperative (positive, only 2nd person) is formed by dropping the verbal prefix (ت-) from the imperfective jussive stem, e.g. 'present!'. If the result starts with two consonants followed by a vowel ( or ), an elidible  (ا) is added to the beginning of the word, usually pronounced as "", e.g. 'write!'. Negative imperatives are formed from the jussive.

The exception to the above rule is the form (or stem) IV verbs. "send!",   'add!'.

The subjunctive is used in subordinate clauses after certain conjunctions. The jussive is used in negation, in negative imperatives, and in the hortative +jussive. For example: 2.  m.:
 imperfect indicative   'you are doing'
 subjunctive   'that you do'
 jussive   its meaning is dependent upon the prefix which attaches to it; in this case, it means 'may you do not do!'
 short energetic   its meaning is dependent upon the prefix which attaches to it; if the prefix is "la" it means 'you should do'
 long energetic   it has more emphasis than the short energetic, its meaning is dependent upon the prefix which attaches to it; if the prefix is "la" it means 'you must do'
 imperative   'do!'.

Voice

Arabic has two verbal voices (  "forms"), active, and passive. The passive voice is expressed by a change in vocalization. For example:
active   'he did',   'he is doing'
passive   'it was done',   'it is being done'

Thus, the active and passive forms are spelled identically in Arabic; only their vowel markings differ. There are some exceptions to this in the case of weak roots.

Participle
Every verb has a corresponding active participle, and most have passive participles. E.g.   'teacher' is the active participle to stem II. of the root   ('know').
Stems II–X take prefix   and nominal endings for both the participles, active and passive. II. active  , and passive  ).

Verbal noun (maṣdar) 

In addition to a participle, there is a verbal noun (in Arabic, literally meaning 'source'), sometimes called a gerund, which is similar to English gerunds and verb-derived nouns of various sorts (e.g. "running" and "a run" from "to run"; "objection" from "to object"). As shown by the English examples, its meaning refers both to the act of doing something and (by frequent semantic extension) to its result. One of its syntactic functions is as a verbal complement of another verb, and this usage it corresponds to the English gerund or infinitive (He prevented me from running or He began to run).
verbal noun formation to stem I is irregular.
For example:   'preparation' is the verbal noun to stem II. of ح-ض-ر  ('to be present').
There are also some verbal nouns of the form  :  , 'he strove', yields   'striving' (for a cause or purpose).

Derivational categories, conjugations
The system of verb conjugations in Arabic is quite complicated, and is formed along two axes. One axis, known as the form (described as "Form I", "Form II", etc.), is used to specify grammatical concepts such as causative, intensive, reciprocal, passive or reflexive, and involves varying the stem form. The other axis, known as the weakness, is determined by the particular consonants making up the root. 'throw',   'call'), and doubled (or germinated) verbs have the second and third consonants the same (e.g. 'extend'). These "weaknesses" have the effect of inducing various irregularities in the stems and endings of the associated verbs.

Examples of the different forms of a sound verb (i.e. with no root weaknesses), from the root   'write' (using   'red' for Form IX, which is limited to colors and physical defects):

The main types of weakness are as follows:

Conjugation

Regular verb conjugation for person-number, tense-aspect-mood, and participles 
In Arabic the grammatical person and number as well as the mood are designated by a variety of prefixes and suffixes. The following table shows the paradigm of a regular sound Form I verb,  'to write'. Most of the final short vowels are often omitted in speech, except the vowel of the feminine plural ending , and normally the vowel of the past tense second person feminine singular ending .

The initial vowel in the imperative (which is elidable) varies from verb to verb, as follows:
 The initial vowel is  if the stem begins with two consonants and the next vowel is anything else.
 There is no initial vowel if the stem begins with one consonant.

 in final  is silent.

Weak roots 
Roots containing one or two of the radicals و , ي  or ء  often lead to verbs with special phonological rules because these radicals can be influenced by their surroundings. Such verbs are called "weak" (verba infirma, 'weak verbs') and their paradigms must be given special attention. According to the position of the weak radical in the root, the root can be classified into four classes: first weak, second weak, third weak (or final weak) and doubled, where both the second and third radicals are identical. Some roots fall into more than one category at once.

Assimilated (first-weak) roots 
Most first-weak verbs have a و  as their first radical. These verbs are entirely regular in the past tense. In the non-past, the  drops out, leading to a shorter stem (e.g. (وجد (يجد  'to find'), where the stem is ـجدـ  in place of a longer stem like ـجلدـ  from the verb (جلد (يجلد  'to whip, flog'. This same stem is used throughout, and there are no other irregularities except for the imperative, which has no initial vowel, consistent with the fact that the stem for the imperative begins with only one consonant.

There are various types of assimilated (first-weak) Form I verbs:

Hollow (second-weak) roots 
The following shows a paradigm of a typical Form I hollow (second-weak) verb (قال (قلت، يقول  (root: ق-و-ل q-w-l) 'to say', parallel to verbs of the (فعل (يفعل  type. See notes following the table for explanation.

All hollow (second-weak) verbs are conjugated in a parallel fashion. The endings are identical to those of strong verbs, but there are two stems (a longer and a shorter) in each of the past and non-past. The longer stem is consistently used whenever the ending begins with a vowel, and the shorter stem is used in all other circumstances. The longer stems end in a long vowel plus consonant, while the shorter stems end in a short vowel plus consonant. The shorter stem is formed simply by shortening the vowel of the long stem in all paradigms other than the active past of Form I verbs. In the active past paradigms of Form I, however, the longer stem always has an  vowel, while the shorter stem has a vowel  or  corresponding to the actual second root consonant of the verb.

No initial vowel is needed in the imperative forms because the non-past stem does not begin with two consonants.

There are various types of Form I hollow verbs:
 (قال قلن (يقول يقلن (root: ق-و-ل)  'to say', formed from verbs with و  as their second root consonant and parallel to verbs of the (فعل (يفعل  type
 (سار سرن (يسير يسرن (root: س-ي-ر)  'to get going, to travel', formed from verbs with ي  as their second root consonant and parallel to verbs of the  type
 (خاف خفن (يخاف يخفن (root: خ-و-ف)  'to fear', formed from verbs with و  as their second root consonant and parallel to verbs of the (فعل (يفعل  type
 (نام نمن (ينام ينمن (root: ن-ي-م)  'to sleep', formed from verbs with ي  as their second root consonant and parallel to verbs of the (فعل (يفعل  type

The passive paradigm of all Form I hollow verbs is as follows:
 (قيل قلن (يقال يقلن  'to be said'

Defective (third-weak) roots

فعى يفعي  
The following shows a paradigm of a typical Form I defective (third-weak) verb (رمى (يرمي  (root: ر-م-ي r-m-y) 'to throw', parallel to verbs of the (فعل (يفعل  type. See notes following the table for explanation.

Two stems each
Each of the two main stems (past and non-past) comes in two variants, a full and a shortened. For the past stem, the full is رميـ , shortened to رمـ  in much of the third person (i.e. before vowels, in most cases). The full non-past stem ـرميـ  appears as ـرميـ  when not before a vowel; this is an automatic alternation in Classical Arabic. The places where the shortened stems occur are indicated by silver (past), gold (non-past).

Irregular endings
The endings are actually mostly regular. But some endings are irregular, in boldface:
 Some of the third-person past endings are irregular, in particular those in رمى  'he threw', رموا  'they threw'. These simply have to be memorized.
 Two kinds of non-past endings are irregular, both in the "suffixless" parts of the paradigm (largely referring to singular masculine or singular combined-gender). In the indicative, the full stem ـرمي  actually appears normally; what is irregular is the lack of the  normally marking the indicative. In the jussive, on the other hand, the stem actually assumes a unique shortened form ـرمـ , with a short vowel that is not represented by a letter in the Arabic.

(فعا (يفعو  
The following shows a paradigm of a typical Form I defective (third-weak) verb (دعا (يدعو (root: د-ع-و)  'to call', parallel to verbs of the (فعل (يفعل  type. Verbs of this sort are entirely parallel to verbs of the (فعا (يفعي  type, although the exact forms can still be tricky. See notes following the table for explanation.

Verbs of this sort are work nearly identically to verbs of the (فعى (يفعي  type. There are the same irregular endings in the same places, and again two stems in each of the past and non-past tenses, with the same stems used in the same places:
 In the past, the full stem is دعوـ , shortened to دعـ .
 In the non-past, the full stem is دعوـ , rendered as دعوـ  when not before a vowel and shortened to دعـ  before ـُو، ـِي .

The Arabic spelling has the following rules:
 In the third person masculine singular past, regular ا  appears instead of ى : hence دَعَا not *دَعَى.
 The otiose final  appears only after the final  of the plural, not elsewhere: hence تَدْعُو 'you call' but تَدْعُوا 'you call', even though they are both pronounced تدعو .

فعي يفعى  

The following shows a paradigm of a typical Form I defective (third-weak) verb  (root: ن-س-ي) 'to forget', parallel to verbs of the (فعل (يفعل  type. These verbs differ in a number of significant respects from either of the above types.

Multiple stems
This variant is somewhat different from the variants with ـِي  or ـُو  in the non-past. As with other third-weak verbs, there are multiple stems in each of the past and non-past, a full stem composed following the normal rules and one or more shortened stems.
 In this case, only one form in the past uses a shortened stem: نسوـ  'they forgot'. All other forms are constructed regularly, using the full stem نسيـ  or its automatic pre-consonant variant نسيـ .
 In the non-past, however, there are at least three different stems:
 The full stem نسيـ  occurs before  or ـنـ , that is before dual endings, feminine plural endings and energetic endings corresponding to forms that are endingless in the jussive.
 The modified stem نساـ  occurs in "endingless" forms (i.e. masculine or common-gender singular, plus 1st plural). As usual with third-weak verbs, it is shortened to نسـ  in the jussive. These forms are marked with red.
The table above chooses to segment them as تنسين , تنسون , suggesting that a shortened stem ـنسـ  combines with irregular (compressed) endings ـين  < ـين , ـون  < ـون . Similarly subjunctive/jussive تنسوا  < تنسيوا ; but note energetic تنسون  < تنسين , where the original ـيـ  has assimilated to ـوـ . Consistent with the above analysis, we analyze this form as تنسون , with an irregular energetic ending ـون  where a glide consonant has developed after the previous vowel. However, since all moods in this case have a form containing ـنسوـ , an alternative analysis would consider ـنسوـ  and ـنسيـ  as stems. These forms are marked with gold.

Irregular endings
The endings are actually mostly regular. But some endings are irregular in the non-past, in boldface:
 The non-past endings in the "suffixless" parts of the paradigm (largely referring to singular masculine or singular combined-gender). In the indicative and subjunctive, the modified stem ـنساـ  appears, and is shortened to ـنسـ  in the jussive. In the forms actually appears normally; what is irregular is the lack of the  normally marking the indicative. In the jussive, on the other hand, the stem actually assumes a unique shortened form ـنسـ , with a short vowel that is not represented by a letter in the Arabic script.
These are analyzed here as consisting of a shortened stem form ـنسـ  plus irregular (shortened or assimilated) endings.

Doubled roots 
The following shows a paradigm of a typical Form I doubled verb (مد (يمد (root: م-د-د)  'to extend', parallel to verbs of the (فعل (يفعل  type. See notes following the table for explanation.

All doubled verbs are conjugated in a parallel fashion. The endings are for the most part identical to those of strong verbs, but there are two stems (a regular and a modified) in each of the past and non-past. The regular stems are identical to the stem forms of sound verbs, while the modified stems have the two identical consonants pulled together into a geminate consonant and the vowel between moved before the geminate. In the above verb (مد (يمد  'to extend' (s.th.), the past stems are مددـ  (regular), مدـ  (modified), and the non-past stems are مددـ  (regular), مدـ  (modified). In the table, places where the regular past stem occurs are in silver, and places where the regular non-past stem occurs are in gold; everywhere else, the modified stem occurs.

No initial vowel is needed in most of the imperative forms because the modified non-past stem does not begin with two consonants.

The concept of having two stems for each tense, one for endings beginning with vowels and one for other endings, occurs throughout the different kinds of weaknesses.

Following the above rules, endingless jussives would have a form like تمدد , while the corresponding indicatives and subjunctives would have forms like تمد , تمد . As a result, for the doubled verbs in particular, there is a tendency to harmonize these forms by adding a vowel to the jussives, usually , sometimes . These are the only irregular endings in these paradigms, and have been indicated in boldface. The masculine singular imperative likewise has multiple forms, based on the multiple forms of the jussive.

There are various types of doubled Form I verbs:

Formation of derived stems ("forms") 
Arabic verb morphology includes augmentations of the root, also known as forms, an example of the derived stems found among the Semitic languages. For a typical verb based on a triliteral root (i.e. a root formed using three root consonants), the basic form is termed Form I, while the augmented forms are known as Form II, Form III, etc. The forms in normal use are Form I through Form X; Forms XI through XV exist but are rare and obsolescent. Forms IX and XI are used only with adjectival roots referring to colors and physical defects (e.g. "red", "blue", "blind", "deaf", etc.), and are stative verbs having the meaning of "be X" or "become X" (e.g. Form IX  'be red, become red, blush', Form XI  with the same meaning). Although the structure that a given root assumes in a particular augmentation is predictable, its meaning is not (although many augmentations have one or more "usual" or prototypical meanings associated with them), and not all augmentations exist for any given root. As a result, these augmentations are part of the system of derivational morphology, not part of the inflectional system.

The construction of a given augmentation is normally indicated using the dummy root  (ف–ع–ل), based on the verb  'to do'. Because Arabic has no direct equivalent to the infinitive form of Western languages, the third-person masculine singular past tense is normally used as the dictionary form of a given verb, i.e. the form by which a verb is identified in a dictionary or grammatical discussion.

Verbs based on quadriliteral roots (roots with four consonants) also exist. There are four augmentations for such verbs, known as Forms Iq, IIq, IIIq and IVq. These have forms similar to Forms II, V, VII and IX respectively of triliteral verbs. Forms IIIq and IVq are fairly rare. The construction of such verbs is typically given using the dummy verb  (root: ف-ع-ل-ل). However, the choice of this particular verb is somewhat non-ideal in that the third and fourth consonants of an actual verb are typically not the same, despite the same consonant used for both; this is a particular problem e.g. for Form IVq. The verb tables below use the dummy verb  (root: ف-ع-ل-ق) instead.

Some grammars, especially of colloquial spoken varieties rather than of Classical Arabic, use other dummy roots. For example, A Short Reference Grammar of Iraqi Arabic (Wallace M. Erwin) uses فمل  (root: ف-م-ل) and فستل  (root: ف-س-ت-ل) for three and four-character roots, respectively (standing for "First Middle Last" and "First Second Third Last"). Commonly the dummy consonants are given in capital letters.

The system of identifying verb augmentations by Roman numerals is an invention by Western scholars. Traditionally, Arabic grammarians did not number the augmentations at all, instead identifying them by the corresponding dictionary form. For example, Form V would be called "the  form".

Each form can have either active or passive forms in the past and non-past tenses, so reflexives are different from passives.

Note that the present passive of forms I and IV are the same. Otherwise there is no confusion.

Sound verbs
Sound verbs are those verbs with no associated irregularities in their constructions.

Some verbs that would be classified as "weak" according to the consonants of the verb root are nevertheless conjugated as a strong verb. This happens, for example:
Largely, to all verbs whose only weakness is a hamzah radical; the irregularity is in the Arabic spelling but not the pronunciation, except in a few minor cases.
To all verbs conjugated in Forms II, III, V, VI whose only weakness is a و  or ي  in the first or second radicals (or both).

Form VIII assimilations
Form VIII has a ـتـ -t- that is infixed into the root, directly after the first root consonant. This ـتـ -t- assimilates to certain coronal consonants occurring as the first root consonant. In particular, with roots whose first consonant is د، ز، ث، ذ، ص، ط، ض، ظ d z th dh ṣ ṭ ḍ ẓ, the combination of root and infix ت t appears as دّ، زد، ثّ، ذّ، صط، طّ، ضط، ظّ dd zd thth dhdh ṣṭ ṭṭ ḍṭ ẓẓ. That is, the t assimilates the emphasis of the emphatic consonants ص، ط، ض، ظ ṣ ṭ ḍ ẓ and the voicing of د، ز d z, and assimilates entirely to the interdental consonants ث، ذ، ظ th dh ẓ. The consonant cluster ضط ḍṭ, as in اضطرّ  'compel, force', is unexpected given modern pronunciation, having a voiced stop next to a voiceless one; this reflects the fact that ط  was formerly pronounced voiced, and ض  was pronounced as the emphatic equivalent not of د  but of an unusual lateral sound.

Defective (third-weak) verbs
Other than for Form I active, there is only one possible form for each verb, regardless of whether the third root consonant is و  or ي . All of the derived third-weak verbs have the same active-voice endings as (فعى (يفعي  verbs except for Forms V and VI, which have past-tense endings like (فعى (يفعي  verbs but non-past endings like (فعي (يفعى  verbs. The passive-voice endings of all third-weak verbs (whether Form I or derived) are the same as for the (فعي (يفعى  verbs. The verbal nouns have various irregularities: feminine in Form II, -in declension in Form V and VI, glottal stop in place of root w/y in Forms VII–X.

The active and passive participles of derived defective verbs consistently are of the -in and -an declensions, respectively.

Defective Form IX verbs are extremely rare. Heywood and Nahmad list one such verb,  'be/become blind', which does not follow the expected form اعميّ . They also list a similarly rare Form XI verb اعمايّ  'be/become blind' — this time with the expected form.

Hollow (second-weak) verbs
Only the forms with irregularities are shown. The missing forms are entirely regular, with w or y appearing as the second radical, depending on the root. There are unexpected feminine forms of the verbal nouns of Form IV, X.

Assimilated (first-weak) verbs
When the first radical is w, it drops out in the Form I non-past. Most of the derived forms are regular, except that the sequences uw iw are assimilated to ū ī, and the sequence wt in Form VIII is assimilated to tt throughout the paradigm. The following table only shows forms with irregularities in them.

The initial w also drops out in the common Form I verbal noun علة  (e.g. صلة  'arrival, link' from وصلة  'arrive').
Root: و-ع-ل

When the first radical is y, the forms are largely regular. The following table only shows forms that have some irregularities in them, indicated in boldface.
Root: ي-ع-ل

Doubled verbs
Root: ف-ل-ل

Hamzated verbs
The largest problem with so-called "hamzated" verbs (those with a glottal stop ʾ or "hamzah" as any of the root consonants) is the complicated way of writing such verbs in the Arabic script (see the article on hamzah for the rules regarding this). In pronunciation, these verbs are in fact almost entirely regular.

The only irregularity occurs in verbs with a hamzah ء as the first radical. A phonological rule in Classical Arabic disallows the occurrence of two hamzahs in a row separated by a short vowel, assimilating the second to the preceding vowel (hence ʾaʾ ʾiʾ ʾuʾ become ʾā ʾī ʾū). This affects the following forms:
The first-person singular of the non-past of Forms I, IV and VIII.
The entire past and imperative of Form IV.

This affects the following forms:
The entire imperative of Form I.
The entire past and imperative of Form VIII, as well as the verbal noun of Form VIII.

There are the following irregularities:
The common verbs  (أكل; root: ء-ك-ل) 'eat',  (أخذ; root: ء-خ-ذ) 'take',  (أمر; root: ء-م-ر) 'command' have irregular, short imperatives .
Form VIII of the common verb  'take' is  'take on, assume', with irregular assimilation of the hamzah.
The common verb  'ask' has an alternative non-past  with missing hamzah.

Doubly weak verbs
Doubly weak verbs have two "weak" radicals; a few verbs are also triply weak. Generally, the above rules for weak verbs apply in combination, as long as they do not conflict. The following are cases where two types of weaknesses apply in combination:
Verbs with a w in the first radical and a w or y in the third radical. These decline as defective (third-weak) verbs, and also undergo the loss of w in the non-past of Form I, e.g. 'guard',  'complete, fulfill (a promise)',  'be near, follow'. These verbs have extremely short imperatives  (feminine , masculine plural , feminine plural ), although these are not normally used in Modern Standard Arabic. Similarly, verbs of this sort in Form IV and Form VIII are declined as defective but also have the normal assimilations of w-initial verbs, e.g.
Verbs with a hamzah in the first radical and a w or y in the third radical. These decline as defective (third-weak) verbs, and also undergo the assimilations associated with the initial hamzah, e.g. the common verb  'come' (first singular non-past  'I come') and the related Form IV verb  'bring' (first singular non-past  'I bring').

The following are examples where weaknesses would conflict, and hence one of the "weak" radicals is treated as strong:
Verbs with a w or y in both the second and third radicals. These are fairly common, e.g.  'recount, transmit'. These decline as regular defective (third-weak) verbs; the second radical is treated as non-weak.
Verbs with a w in the first radical and the second and third radicals the same. These verbs do not undergo any assimilations associated with the first radical, e.g.  'to love'.
Verbs with a hamza in the first radical and the second and third radicals the same. These verbs do not undergo any assimilations associated with the first radical, e.g.  'burn', first singular non-past  'I burn', despite the two hamzahs in a row.

The following are cases with special irregularities:
Verbs with a w or y in the second radical and a hamzah in the third radical. These are fairly common, e.g. the extremely common verb  'come'. The only irregularity is the Form I active participle, e.g.  'coming', which is irregularly declined as a defective (third-weak) participle (presumably to avoid a sequence of two hamzahs in a row, as the expected form would be *).
The extremely common verb  'see'. The hamzah drops out entirely in the non-past. Similarly in the passive,  'be seen'. The active participle is regular  and the passive participle is regular . The related Form IV verb  'show' is missing the hamzah throughout. Other augmentations are regular: Form III  'dissemble', Form VI  'look at one another', Form VIII  'think'.
The common verb  'live', with an alternative past tense . Form IV  'resuscitate, revive' is regular.

Summary of vowels
The vowels for the various forms are summarized in this table:

Verbs in colloquial Arabic

The Classical Arabic system of verbs is largely unchanged in the colloquial spoken varieties of Arabic. The same derivational system of augmentations exists, including triliteral Forms I through X and quadriliteral Forms I and II, constructed largely in the same fashion (the rare triliteral Forms XI through XV and quadriliteral Forms III and IV have vanished). The same system of weaknesses (strong, defective/third-weak, hollow/second-weak, assimilated/first-weak, doubled) also exists, again constructed largely in the same fashion. Within a given verb, two stems (past and non-past) still exist along with the same two systems of affixes (suffixing past-tense forms and prefixing/suffixing non-past forms).

The largest changes are within a given paradigm, with a significant reduction in the number of forms. The following is an example of a regular verb paradigm in Egyptian Arabic.

This paradigm shows clearly the reduction in the number of forms:
The thirteen person/number/gender combinations of Classical Arabic have been reduced to eight, through the loss of dual and feminine-plural forms. (Some varieties still have feminine-plural forms, generally marked with the suffix -an, leading to a total of ten forms. This occurs, for example, in Iraqi Arabic and in many of the varieties of the Arabian peninsula.)
The system of suffix-marked mood distinctions has been lost, other than the imperative. Egyptian Arabic and many other "urban" varieties (e.g. Moroccan Arabic, Levantine Arabic) have non-past endings  inherited from the original subjunctive forms, but some varieties (e.g. Iraqi Arabic) have  endings inherited from the original indicative. Most varieties have also gained new moods, and a new future tense, marked through the use of prefixes (most often with an unmarked subjunctive vs. an indicative marked with a prefix, e.g. Egyptian bi-, Levantine b-, Moroccan ta-/ka-). Various particles are used for the future (e.g. Egyptian ḥa-, Levantine raḥ-, Moroccan ɣa(di)-), derived from reduced forms of various verbs.
The internal passive is lost almost everywhere. Instead, the original reflexive/mediopassive augmentations (e.g. Forms V, VI, VII) serve as both reflexive and passive. The passive of Forms II and III is generally constructed with a reflex of Forms V and VI, using a prefix it- derived from the Classical prefix ta-. The passive of Form I uses either a prefix in- (from Form VII) or it- (modeled after Forms V and VI). The other forms often have no passive.

In addition, Form IV is lost entirely in most varieties, except for a few "classicizing" verbs (i.e. verbs borrowed from Modern Standard Arabic).

See varieties of Arabic for more information on grammar differences in the spoken varieties.

Negation 

The negation of Arabic verbs varies according to the tense of the verb phrase. In literary Modern Standard Arabic, present-tense verbs are negated by adding   "not" before the verb, past-tense verbs are negated by adding the negative particle   "not" before the verb, and putting the verb in the jussive mood; and future-tense expressions are negated by placing the negative particle   before the verb in the subjunctive mood.

See also
 Wiktionary's appendix on Arabic verb forms

References

Arabic grammar
Afroasiatic verbs